Dahoma is an unincorporated community in Nassau County, Florida, United States. It is located on US 301, in the southwestern part of the county.

Geography

References

Unincorporated communities in Nassau County, Florida
Unincorporated communities in the Jacksonville metropolitan area
Unincorporated communities in Florida